The Regius Chair of Surgery at the University of Glasgow was founded in 1815 by King George III, who also established the Chairs of Chemistry and Natural History.

Notable Professors have included Joseph Lister (1860–1869), who developed antisepsis through the use of phenol in sterilising instruments and in cleaning wounds, and Sir William Macewen, a pioneer in modern brain surgery who contributed to the development of bone graft surgery, the surgical treatment of hernia and of pneumonectomy (removal of the lungs).

The current occupant is Professor Andrew Biankin.

Regius Professors of Surgery
 1815 – John Burns
 1850 – James Lawrie
 1860 – Joseph Lister, 1st Baron Lister
 1869 – Sir George Husband Baird MacLeod
 1892 – Sir William Macewen
 1924 – Archibald Young
 1939 – Sir Charles Illingworth
 1964 – Sir Andrew Kay
 1999 – William George
 2013 – Andrew Biankin

See also
List of Professorships at the University of Glasgow
University of Glasgow Medical School

References

Surgery
1815 establishments in Scotland
Surgery
Professorships in medicine